Johannes Berendt (born 1981 in Germany) has been a syndicated columnist (during the 2006 World Cup and beyond) and the German correspondent for the football radio show World Soccer Daily.

External links 
 https://web.archive.org/web/20061114172541/http://www.worldsoccerweekly.com/bios/berendt.html
  

German male journalists
21st-century German journalists
Living people
1981 births
21st-century German male writers
Date of birth missing (living people)